Daniel de Carvalho (born 13 May 1996), commonly known as Daniel, is a Brazilian footballer who currently plays as a midfielder for Mirassol.

Career statistics

Club

Notes

References

External links

1996 births
Living people
Brazilian footballers
Association football midfielders
Campeonato Brasileiro Série C players
Campeonato Brasileiro Série D players
Sociedade Esportiva Palmeiras players
Clube Atlético Bragantino players
Clube Atlético Votuporanguense players
Rio Claro Futebol Clube players
Associação Ferroviária de Esportes players
Associação Atlética Caldense players
Boa Esporte Clube players
Mirassol Futebol Clube players
People from São Bernardo do Campo
Footballers from São Paulo (state)